Walter Bowden (December 29, 1910 – April 19, 2001) was an American male handball player. He was a member of the United States men's national handball team. He was a part of the  team at the 1936 Summer Olympics, playing 3 matches. On club level he played for German Sport Club Brooklyn in the United States.

References

External links
 
 

1910 births
2001 deaths
American male handball players
Olympic handball players of the United States
Field handball players at the 1936 Summer Olympics
Sportspeople from New York (state)